Neohelix is a genus (or a subgenus under Triodopsis) of air-breathing land snails, terrestrial pulmonate gastropod mollusks in the family Polygyridae.

The shells of Neohelix are not distinguishable from those of the genus Mesodon, but the reproductive anatomy of the two groups of snails is different.

Species
Species within the genus Neohelix include: 
 Neohelix albolabris
 Neohelix dentifera
 Neohelix divesta
 Neohelix multilineata 
 Neohelix major
 Neohelix solemi
* Neohelix alleni

References

Polygyridae
Taxa named by Hermann von Ihering